Lily Ebert  (born 29 December 1923) is a Hungarian-born Holocaust survivor, living in London.

Personal life 
Ebert was born in Bonyhád, Hungary. She was the eldest daughter in a family of six children.

The Holocaust 
The Nazis invaded Hungary in March 1944, and, in July 1944, when Ebert was 20 years old, she along with her mother, younger brother and three sisters were deported to Auschwitz-Birkenau. Ebert's mother Nina, younger brother Bela, and younger sister Berta were immediately sent to the gas chambers, whilst Ebert and her two other sisters, Renee and Piri, were selected for work in the camp.

Four months after arriving in the camp, Ebert and her two sisters were transferred to a munitions factory near Leipzig, where they worked until liberation by Allied forces from the Death March in 1945.

Post-Holocaust 
After she was liberated, Ebert travelled with her surviving sisters to Switzerland in order to start rebuilding their life. In 1953 Ebert was reunited with her other brother, who had also survived the Nazi camp and slave-labour system. The family emigrated to Israel where she married and had three children, before settling in London in 1967. Ebert now has 10 grandchildren and 36 great grandchildren.

In 2021, during the COVID-19 pandemic, with her great grandson Dov Forman, Ebert co-authored The Sunday Times Best-Seller Lily's Promise: How I Survived Auschwitz and Found the Strength to Live, which includes a foreword by King Charles. Lily's Promise is a five-time Sunday Times Best-Seller and was the Waterstones best history book of 2021. Lily's Promise is also a three-time New York Times bestseller, debuting at number 2, and was chosen as the Costco US buyers' pick for May 2022.

Also in 2021, Ebert and Forman used the TikTok video sharing platform, gaining more than a million followers for clips in which Ebert answers people's questions about surviving the Holocaust, when she was a prisoner at Auschwitz concentration camp. Ebert and Forman's account has over 1.7 million followers, it has received over 25 million ‘likes’ and their top 5 most popular videos have collectively been viewed by over 50 million people.

Ebert and Forman have collaborated with various departments of the UK Government (including the Department for Education, the Foreign Office, the Home Office and the Department for Levelling Up, Housing and Communities) and in November 2020, they spoke at the UK Parliament in favour of the UK Holocaust Memorial and Learning Centre. Ebert and Forman have also appeared on international radio and television, giving interviews to over 180 news outlets in more than 35 countries.

Ebert's portrait was one of seven commissioned by Prince Charles for the Royal Collection to remember survivors of the holocaust and as a tribute for the survivors who made their life in Britain. When the portraits were released in the Queen's Gallery at Buckingham Palace Ebert told Charles "Meeting you, it is for everyone who lost their lives." Charles touched her shoulder and replied: "But it is a greater privilege for me."

Honours and awards 
Ebert was awarded the British Empire Medal (BEM) in the 2016 New Year Honours for services to Holocaust education and awareness. She was appointed Member of the Order of the British Empire (MBE) in the 2023 New Year Honours for services to Holocaust education. On 31 January 2023, in an investiture ceremony at Windsor Castle, she received the award from King Charles III.

Ebert's great grandson Dov Forman received the Points of Light award from the UK Prime Minister at 10 Downing Street, in November 2021, in recognition of exceptional services to Holocaust education.

Ebert and Forman were awarded with the community award, from Andrew Neil, at the Jewish Care and Topland business lunch in March 2022, at the Grosvenor House Hotel.

In April 2022, Ebert was awarded the Knight’s Cross of the Order of Merit of Hungary, one of Hungary's highest national honours, by Ambassador Ferenc Kumin of Hungary to the United Kingdom, on behalf of the President and the Hungarian government.

In May 2022, Ebert was the winner of the inaugural Simon Wiesenthal Prize. At a ceremony in the Austrian parliament, Ebert was given the award for civic engagement against antisemitism and for education about the Holocaust. The award was presented by the European Commission’s coordinator on combating antisemitism. The commissioner praised Mrs Ebert for her decades-long engagement as a witness to the Holocaust and her recent turn to TikTok, a platform on which she and her great-grandson Dov Forman have amassed over 1.9 million followers and brought her life story to a whole new audience.

External links

References 

Holocaust survivors
1923 births
Living people
Activists against antisemitism
Hungarian Jews
Recipients of the British Empire Medal
British TikTokers
Knight's Crosses of the Order of Merit of the Republic of Hungary (civil)
Writers on antisemitism
World War II civilian prisoners
 
Simon Wiesenthal Center
 
 
Auschwitz concentration camp
Auschwitz concentration camp survivors
Jewish concentration camp survivors
Hungarian writers
Holocaust historiography
British religious writers
British people of Hungarian-Jewish descent
British memoirists
British activists
Jewish women writers
Members of the Order of the British Empire
Hungarian emigrants to England
Naturalised citizens of the United Kingdom